Luis Hernán Mosquera (born 25 May 1989) is a Colombian professional footballer who plays as midfielder for Millonarios. 

Mosquera is a product of the Millonarios youth system and played with the Millonarios first team since January, 2009.

Clubs Statistics
(As of November 14, 2010)

References

External links
BDFA profile

1989 births
Living people
Colombian footballers
Categoría Primera A players
Millonarios F.C. players
Deportivo Pasto footballers
Águilas Doradas Rionegro players
Association football midfielders